= American Whig =

American Whig may refer to:

- Patriot (American Revolution), in 18th-century America
- Whig Party (United States), in 19th-century America

== See also ==
- British Whig
